Paul Bichelhuber (born February 22, 1987 in Wien) is an Austrian professional association football player, currently playing for Austrian Football Bundesliga side LASK Linz. He plays as an Attacking Midfield.

He has been with the SV Leobendorf team since July 1, 2015.

External links
 

1989 births
Living people
Austrian footballers
Association football midfielders
LASK players
First Vienna FC players
Austrian Football Bundesliga players
Footballers from Vienna